RAIN is an appropriate technology, environmental, and community-organizing journal that began in Portland, Oregon in 1974.

From its mission statement:

"RAIN began publication in 1974, as a networking tool among community groups in Portland, Oregon. It went on to become a global resource in the appropriate technology movement. In 1989, RAIN offices moved to Eugene, Oregon, and it became a journal of organizers publishing news, research, and interviews on the topic of building successful community projects."

References 

Environmental magazines
Environmental websites